Nightwork is the third studio album by the Swedish black metal band Diabolical Masquerade released in 1998 through Avantgarde Music.

Track listing

Production details

Produced by Dan Swanö with Blakkheim.
Recorded, Mixed and Mastered at The Sanctuary April 1998.
Album photo by Matthew Septimus / Photonic / Bulls.
Blakkheim photo by Mala.
Diabolical Masquerade logo by Blakkheim.
Digital design and concept by Blakkheim and Sir Robert Graves (Greylife Research).
All music, lyrics, and concepts written and arranged 1997 / 1998.
Re-released by Peaceville Records in 2007 as a digipack. Comes with the bonus track Cryztalline Fiendz.

Personnel
Blakkheim : Guitars, vocals, bass, keyboards
Dan Swanö : Drums and percussion, keyboards, effects, backing vocal

Additional personnel
Ingmar Döhn : Cello, additional bass lines
Marie Gaard Engberg : Flute

References

Diabolical Masquerade albums
1998 albums
Avantgarde Music albums
Albums produced by Dan Swanö